Dagmar Pohlmann  (born 7 February 1972) is a German retired football midfielder. She was part of the Germany women's national football team and competed at the 1996 Summer Olympics, playing one match. At the club level, she played for FSV Frankfurt.

See also
 Germany at the 1996 Summer Olympics

References

External links
 
 
 womensoccer.de
 munzinger.de
 dfb.de
 
 youtube.com

1972 births
Living people
German women's footballers
Place of birth missing (living people)
Footballers at the 1996 Summer Olympics
Women's association football midfielders
Germany women's international footballers
Olympic footballers of Germany
1995 FIFA Women's World Cup players
UEFA Women's Championship-winning players
Footballers from Frankfurt